Calophyllum collinum is a species of flowering plant in the Calophyllaceae family. It is found in West Papua (Indonesia) and Papua New Guinea.

References

collinum
Flora of Papua New Guinea
Flora of Western New Guinea
Data deficient plants
Taxonomy articles created by Polbot
Plants described in 1980